The following is a non-exhaustive list of the etymologies of the place names in Los Angeles, California

A-K

L-Z

References 

Los Angeles, California
Place names, etymologies of
Place names, etymologies of
Etymologies of place names